The Sea o'Erin Stakes was American Thoroughbred horse race held annually in early September at Arlington Park racetrack in Arlington Heights, Illinois. A Grade III event open to horses age three and older, it was contested on turf over a distance of one mile (8 furlongs).

Inaugurated in 1980 as the Sea o'Erin Handicap, the race was run at various distances:
  miles : 1980, 1987
  miles : 1981–1985

Due to heavy rains, the 1996 race was switched from the turf course to the main dirt track.

There was no race run in 1986, 1988, 1995, and 1997–2000.

Records
Speed  record:
 1:34.93 – First And Only (1994)

Most wins:
 No horse has won this race more than once.

Most wins by an owner:
 2 – Team Block (2002, 2005)

Most wins by a jockey:
 2 – Pat Day (1980, 1981)
 2 – Aaron Gryder (1994, 1996)

Most wins by a trainer:
 2 – Chris M. Block (2002, 2005)

Winners

References
 2010 Arlington Park stakes schedule
 Photo at flickr.com of Public Speaker winning the 2009 Sea O'Erin Stakes

Discontinued horse races
Graded stakes races in the United States
Open mile category horse races
Turf races in the United States
Recurring sporting events established in 1980
Arlington Park